Alf James Rudolf Lysholm (14 December 1893 – 20 February 1973) was a Swedish engineer.

Career

Lysholm worked for the Ljungstrom steam turbine company, where he rose to become Chief Engineer.

He is noted for the invention of the rotary screw compressor, which he developed in the 1930s while working on a series of unsuccessful gas turbine engines.

He also developed the hydraulic torque converter.

References

External links
 Swedish Wikipedia article
"Alf Lysholm", Motoring Weekly.

Swedish mechanical engineers
1893 births
1973 deaths